The UEFA European Under-18 Championship 1955 Final Tournament was held in Italy. During this edition, only group matches were played and no winner was declared. This was done to prevent an excess of competition. Romania, Italy, Bulgaria, Hungary and Czechoslovakia were the five group winners.

Teams
The following teams entered the tournament:

 
 
 
 
 
 
 
 
  (host)

Group A

Group B

Group C

Group D

Group E

External links
Results by RSSSF

UEFA European Under-19 Championship
Under-18
1955
Euro
April 1955 sports events in Europe
1955 in youth association football